Alone Together is the debut album by vocalist Gary Williams. It was recorded with the John Wilson Orchestra at Abbey Road Studios and released in 2004. It is a collection of ballads and swing standards arranged by Andrew Cottee.

Critical reception 
Clive Davis of The Sunday Times commented: "Michael Buble is the not only singer keeping the Sinatra flame alive. Britain's Gary Williams has, in fact, been working this side of the saloon for quite some time... His model this time is not so much the insouciant playboy of Songs for Swingin' Lovers as the pure romantic of In the Wee Small Hours."

Malcolm Laycock of Big Band World said: "A collection of gentle ballads from the Great American Songbook, stunningly sung by Gary and perfectly accompanied by John Wilson. The fresh arrangements by Andrew Cottee are simply beautiful. I'll stick my neck out and say I think this is the finest vocal record of its kind to emerge from Britain since the days of Matt Monro."

Roy Booth of Jazz Views commented: "Gary's reading of Alec Wilder's "I'll Be Around" is probably the best I have heard since Sinatra's version on his "Wee Small Hours" album and the beautiful alto playing is the icing on the cake."

Track listing

References

External links 
 Official Gary Williams web site: the Alone Together page

2004 debut albums
Gary Williams (singer) albums